Draga is a small village in the Municipality of Ig in southeastern Slovenia. Until 2007, the area was part of the settlements of Dobravica and Sarsko. The village is part of the traditional region of Inner Carniola and is included in the Central Slovenia Statistical Region.

Name
The name Draga is derived from the Slovene common noun draga 'small, narrow valley', referring to the geographical location of the settlement.

References

External links

Draga on Geopedia

Populated places in the Municipality of Ig
Populated places established in 2007
2007 establishments in Slovenia